Anton Pointner (8 December 1894 in Salzburg – 8 September 1949 in Hintersee) was an Austrian stage and film actor. Pointner's career began on the stages of Austria and performed in both silent and sound films in his native Austria, as well as in Germany and the United States.

Selected filmography

 Martyr of His Heart (1918)
 Lady Hamilton (1921)
 The Love Affairs of Hector Dalmore (1921)
 The Adventuress of Monte Carlo (1921)
 Frauenmoral (1923)
 The Second Shot (1923)
 Earth Spirit (1923)
 The Curse (1924)
 The Sailor Perugino (1924)
 Nelly, the Bride Without a Husband (1924)
 Marionettes of the Princess (1924)
 Flight Around the World (1925)
 Old Mamsell's Secret (1925)
 The Dealer from Amsterdam (1925)
 A Free People (1925)
 Circus Romanelli (1926)
 When I Came Back (1926)
 The Bank Crash of Unter den Linden (1926)
 The Third Squadron (1926)
 The Three Mannequins (1926)
 The White Horse Inn (1926)
 Heads Up, Charley (1927)
 The Impostor (1927)
 The Sporck Battalion (1927)
 Radio Magic (1927)
 Rasputin (1928)
 Five Anxious Days (1928)
 Charlotte Somewhat Crazy (1928)
 Sixteen Daughters and No Father (1928)
 From a Bachelor's Diary (1928)
 Love in the Cowshed (1928)
  The Carousel of Death  (1928)
 The Story of a Little Parisian (1928)
 The Merry Widower (1929)
 Secret Police (1929)
 The Youths (1929)
 The Hero of Every Girl's Dream (1929)
 The Burning Heart (1929)
 Father and Son (1929)
 The Dance Goes On (1930)
 The Woman Without Nerves (1930)
 The Theft of the Mona Lisa (1931)
 Kismet (1931)
 Men Behind Bars (1931)
 The Mask Falls (1931)
 The Sacred Flame (1931)
 Weekend in Paradise (1931)
 The Cheeky Devil (1932)
 Viennese Waltz (1932)
 Gypsies of the Night (1932)
 Mrs. Lehmann's Daughters (1932)
 The Secret of Johann Orth (1932)
 Marshal Forwards (1932)
 Storms of Passion (1932)
  Holzapfel Knows Everything (1932)
 Trenck (1932)
 I by Day, You by Night (1932)
 Impossible Love (1932)
 The Ladies Diplomat (1932)
 Countess Mariza (1932)
 Season in Cairo (1933)
 The Racokzi March (1933)
  The Tsarevich (1933)
 Jumping Into the Abyss (1933)
 The Hymn of Leuthen (1933)
 A Precocious Girl (1934)
 Miss Madame (1934)
 Spring Parade (1934)
 Peter (1934)
 The English Marriage (1934)
 Enjoy Yourselves (1934)
 Suburban Cabaret (1935)
 My Life for Maria Isabella (1935)
 The Royal Waltz (1935)
 Lumpaci the Vagabond (1936)
 Thank You, Madame (1936)
 Stjenka Rasin (1936)
 Hannerl and Her Lovers (1936)
 The Empress's Favourite (1936)
 The Love of the Maharaja (1936)
 The Violet of Potsdamer Platz (1936)
 Fridericus (1937)
 Dangerous Game (1937)
 Woman's Love—Woman's Suffering (1937)
 The Irresistible Man (1937)
 Five Million Look for an Heir (1938)
 Red Orchids (1938)
 Maria Ilona (1939)
  Twelve Minutes After Midnight (1939)
 Renate in the Quartet (1939)
 The Scoundrel (1939)
 Nanette (1940)
 Der Postmeister (1940)
 The Three Codonas (1940)
 My Daughter Lives in Vienna (1940)
 Beloved Augustin (1940)
 Riding for Germany (1941)
 Der große König (1942)
 Anuschka (1942)
 Münchhausen (1943)
 Maresi (1948)
  Who Is This That I Love? (1950)
 Regimental Music (1950)

Bibliography
 Kester, Bernadette. Film Front Weimar: Representations of the First World War in German films of the Weimar Period (1919-1933). Amsterdam University Press, 2003.

External links

1894 births
1949 deaths
Austrian male stage actors
Austrian male silent film actors
Austrian male film actors
Actors from Salzburg
20th-century Austrian male actors